Anthony Basso (born 4 July 1979) is a retired French footballer.

Career

Early career
Basso began his career with the French side Auxerre, but left at a young age to join the Serie A side Udinese. His time in Italy was ultimately unsuccessful, as he made only one appearance for Udinese and spent the rest of the time out on loan at three different lower-league teams. In 2005, Basso moved on to the Tippeligaen side Viking, where he enjoyed a good spell, the highlight of which was his impressive performance in the shock 1–0 home victory over Ligue 1 giants Monaco in the 2005–06 UEFA Cup group stage. This performance enhanced his reputation in his homeland and alerted the interest of several Ligue 1 teams.

Return to Auxerre
In July 2006, Basso completed his return to Auxerre following the departure of fellow keeper Sébastien Hamel to Marseille. Viking had hoped to hold on to their keeper but relented due to his expiring contract and desire to return to his former club. Upon his arrival he described returning as a "dream" and announced his intention to compete with veteran Fabien Cool to be starting goalkeeper. However both Basso and Cool suffered long-term injuries and in December 2006 Auxerre signed Nancy goalkeeper Olivier Sorin, meaning Basso had slipped to third-choice keeper. Following Cool's retirement at the end of the season Auxerre signed young Lyon goalkeeper Rémy Riou making Basso's prospects of first-team football look increasingly bleak.

Hearts
Basso joined Heart of Midlothian on trial in August 2007, and joined permanently later that month. He made his debut against St Mirren on 30 September 2007 at Love Street, in which Hearts won the game 3–1. Towards the end of the 2007–08 season Basso was dropped from the Hearts team as it emerged that talks over a new contract had broken down, his agent suggested that unless Hearts improved their contract offer Basso may look to leave.

Basso was left out of the Hearts squad for their pre-season training camp in Germany, which raised serious questions over his future at the club. Manager Csaba László told Basso he was surplus to requirements and that he was free to look for another club. Scottish First Division side Livingston, where Basso's agent Tomasso Angelini is a director, approached Basso in the hope of signing the Frenchman on a season-long loan deal but Bulgarian side Levski Sofia were also credited with an interest. On 28 January 2009 it was announced Basso had been released by Hearts.

Later career
After being without a club for the rest of 2009, Basso eventually joined Besançon of the French fourth division for the 2010–11 season. Playing only a handful of matches, he transferred to Yverdon-Sport of the Swiss Challenge League in early 2011.

References

French footballers
Udinese Calcio players
Viking FK players
AJ Auxerre players
S.S. Chieti Calcio players
Heart of Midlothian F.C. players
Scottish Premier League players
Association football goalkeepers
French expatriate footballers
Expatriate footballers in Italy
French expatriate sportspeople in Italy
Expatriate footballers in Norway
French expatriate sportspeople in Norway
Expatriate footballers in Scotland
French expatriate sportspeople in Scotland
Expatriate footballers in Switzerland
French expatriate sportspeople in Switzerland
Benevento Calcio players
Yverdon-Sport FC players
Ligue 1 players
Championnat National 2 players
Serie A players
Eliteserien players
1979 births
Living people
Sportspeople from Besançon
Footballers from Bourgogne-Franche-Comté